The Campion School is a Roman Catholic boys' secondary school and coeducational sixth form in Hornchurch, London, England. The school converted to academy status in August 2011, and has a specialism in science.

History
The Campion School was founded in September 1962 by the Society of Jesus as a grammar school for Roman Catholic boys from the ages of 11 to 18. The first headmaster Fr Michael Fox SJ died that year. In 1965, after two successive headmasters, administration of the school was handed on to the Diocese of Brentwood. On opening, some of the original second and third year intake were transferred from St Ignatius' College, which was then located in Stamford Hill. For the first couple of years, Jesuit teachers were in the majority. The Jesuit community lived on the school site in rooms with full facilities in The Community House, which later became the first of three Sixth Form Blocks. Later, only a single, non-residential, Jesuit chaplain was retained as a link to the order.

Pupils who attend the school are mainly Catholic and the school has a Catholic ethos. Around 1970, the first girls to attend Campion came from Ilford Ursuline School for specific sixth form classes such as Russian and Greek at the school, but there were not many. The school has an attached Sixth Form which admits a number of girls. The pupils that attend the Sixth Form do not have to be Catholic but have to respect the Catholic ethos that the school represents.

The school received an Ofsted report in May 2012. The inspection judgements were rated as 2 (good) in all five categories. The school was awarded Specialist Science College status before converting to an academy in August 2011. however the school continues to offer science as a specialism.

Forms

Originally, when the school had around 660 all boys, it had three forms named after Fr Michael Fox SJ and Saints John Fisher and Thomas More. However, each boy also belonged to a House named Gerard, Southwell and Garnet, denoted by a green, blue or red ribbon strip sewn the length of the top of the blazer pocket edge. The Houses met regularly, had a House Master and competed in sports. For a year or two school blazers even had a different crests for Fourth, Fifth and Sixth forms too.

The school currently has five forms:
 Fisher
 More
 Fox
 Garnet
 Southwell

Sport
The school has an outstanding sporting reputation both locally in Havering and nationally with a tradition of rugby. In 2001, The 1st XV won the Daily Mail Cup, becoming the first comprehensive school to win the competition.

Headmasters
 Fr Michael J Fox, S.J. (1 March-27 October 1962)
 Fr William Webb, S.J. (Deputy and Acting) (28 October 1962 – 6 April 1963)
 Fr Peter Hackett, S.J. (7 April 1963 – 1965)
 Philip J. Moloney (1965–18 July 1980)
 Dr John F Rowbottom (2 September 1980 – 1993)
 John Johnson (1993–2011)
 Keith Williams (September 2011–July 2022)
 Paul Larner (September 2022-)

Notable former pupils
Former pupils at the school include:
 Lord Alton – politician
 Ben Dirs – sports journalist
 David Cairns – musician, Secret Affair
 John Green – Saracens rugby player
 Paul McCreesh– conductor
 Damian Cronin – ex-Scotland rugby player
 Tony Diprose – rugby player
 Colin Lynes – IBO light welterweight world champion
 John Rudd – rugby player
 Alan Soper – scientist
 Kevin Sorrell – rugby player
 Alex Iwobi – Footballer 
 Ola Aina – Footballer
 Matt Garvey – Rugby player
 Matt Rowe – songwriter and producer, Spice Girls
 Denis Keefe — Diplomat
 Frank Key - Author

Notable popular culture references

Sounds of Silence is the second studio album by American folk rock duo Simon & Garfunkel, released in 1966. The album cover photo features the duo on a trail looking back towards the camera. It was shot at Franklin Canyon Park in Los Angeles. The secondary school scarves they are wearing were from The Campion School, Hornchurch, UK. This school was attended by the boys of the Brentwood family, with whom Paul Simon lodged during his time in the UK.

References

External links
 School website

Educational institutions established in 1962
Academies in the London Borough of Havering
Boys' schools in London
Catholic secondary schools in the Diocese of Brentwood
1962 establishments in England
Secondary schools in the London Borough of Havering
Hornchurch